Robert Koch (born 26 February 1986) is a German footballer who plays as a midfielder for FC Oberlausitz Neugersdorf.

Career
Koch began his career with Oberlausitzer FC Neugersdorf, making his debut in the Oberliga in 2005. Two years later, he moved to SC Borea Dresden, before signing for Dynamo Dresden in 2009. He initially played for Dynamo Dresden's reserve team, but after seven goals in ten appearances in the NOFV-Oberliga he was promoted to the first-team, making his debut in September 2009, coming on as a substitute for Thomas Hübener in a 1–0 3. Fußball-Liga defeat against Borussia Dortmund II. After the appointment of Matthias Maucksch as Dynamo coach, he became been a regular in the first-team and continued to play regularly under Ralf Loose. At the end of the 2010–11 season, he scored in each leg of the playoff against VfL Osnabrück, in a 4–2 win which secured Dynamo's promotion to the 2. Bundesliga. He scored eight goals in his first season at this level, as well as two goals in a surprise win over Bayer 04 Leverkusen in the first round of the DFB-Pokal. In summer 2012, he was named as Dynamo's captain, taking the armband from Cristian Fiél. After Loose was sacked and replaced by Peter Pacult midway through the 2012–13 season, Koch lost the captaincy to Mickaël Poté.

References

External links
 
 

1986 births
Living people
German footballers
Dynamo Dresden players
1. FC Nürnberg players
Dynamo Dresden II players
2. Bundesliga players
3. Liga players
FSV Zwickau players
Association football midfielders
FC Oberlausitz Neugersdorf players
People from Löbau
Footballers from Saxony